House on the Hill may refer to:

Film and television
 House on the Hill (film), a 2012 American horror film
 The House on the Hill, a 1985 cartoon film released by the Seattle Fire Department
 The House on the Hill, a 1981 British television series

Music

Albums
 The House on the Hill (album) or the title song, by Audience, 1971
 House on the Hill, by Modey Lemon, 2000
 House on the Hill, a mixtape by Ty Dolla Sign, 2011

Songs
 "House on the Hill", by The Pretty Reckless from Going to Hell, 2014
 "House on the Hill", by Beach House from Beach House, 2006
 "House on the Hill", by Gary Burton with Pat Metheny from Reunion, 1990
 "House on the Hill", by Kevin Coyne from Marjory Razorblade, 1973
 "House on the Hill", by Mud, 1969
 "House on the Hill", by Unknown Artist, competing to represent Ireland in the Eurovision Song Contest 1965
 "A House on the Hill", by Johnny Nash, 1961
 "The House on the Hill", by the Luvvers, 1966
 "The House on the Hill", by Stevie Wonder from For Once in My Life, 1968

Other uses
 House on the Hill (card game), a solitaire variant
 The House on the Hill: A History of the Parliament of Western Australia 1832-1990, a 1991 book edited by David Black
 "The House on the Hill", a poem by Edwin Arlington Robinson included in his 1897 collection Children of the Night
 Weyerhaeuser House or House on the Hill, a historic building in Rock Island, Illinois, US

See also
 Betrayal at House on the Hill, a 2004 board game
 A House on a Hill, a 2003 American film
 House on a Hill, a 2019 album by Amanda Lindsey Cook
 House on Hill, a 2006 album by Brad Mehldau
 Our House on the Hill, a 2012 album by the Babies
 Hill House (disambiguation)